Keith McKeddie Doig  (11 December 1891 – 3 January 1949) was an Australian rules footballer who played with University in the Victorian Football League (VFL).

Doig was born in Nathalia, Victoria and his school education was at Geelong College, where he was dux of the school and captain of both cricket and football. From there he went to Ormond College at the University of Melbourne and it was a mark of respect for him as a schoolboy that his fees at Ormond were paid by the headmaster of Geelong College.

At University he excelled in both sport and academic life. He captained his cricket and football teams from his second year on and was made a University blue for both sports. He made 44 appearances for University over the period 1912–1914.

After his year of residency at the Royal Melbourne Hospital he entered the Australian Army Medical Corps in 1916 and spent his time in France. He was awarded the Military Cross in the 1918 New Year Honours.

On returning to civilian life he set up medical practice in Colac in 1920 and married Miss Lewis Maffra Grant the same year. It was a stimulating practice and he gave it all his vital energy and ability. He continued to be keen on sport, this time in tennis, and he was captain of the winning country week tennis team in 1933.

During World War II, the shortage of medical men in the country areas took toll on his health and he suffered his first heart attack in 1948 and his second fatal one in 1949. He was survived by his widow, and four children, the two eldest following him in the practice of medicine, while his daughter Alison became a mathematician.

References

External links 

1891 births
1949 deaths
Australian rules footballers from Victoria (Australia)
University Football Club players
People educated at Geelong College
Recipients of the Military Cross
People from Nathalia, Victoria